Berry Springs Park and Preserve is  a park in and of Williamson County, Texas close to the city of Georgetown, Texas. The park is on farm land with many pecan and oak trees as well as the waters of Berry Springs that provide a lake for fishing with fresh water.  It is bounded on two sides by Berry Creek and Dry Berry Creek.

Activities
Visitors can hike, relax in the shaded fields, collect pecans, fish, camp, let their children play on the playgrounds or visit the donkeys, and barbecue with the family. Barbecue grills are provided near the nicely-located and solidly-built picnic tables and in the pavilions. The pavilions can be rented for a fee. Both primitive and improved campsites are available.  The park is also popular with hikers, bikers and equestrians with its miles of trails and birders with its many trees and prairie areas.  At the northwest end of the park is a Nature Trail traversing forest, savanna and riparian habitats.  The park has clean, modern restrooms and water fountains that provide ice-cold water.

Two RV parks, Berry Springs RV Park and New Life RV Park, are located within two miles of Berry Springs Park and Preserve.

External links

Williamson County — Berry Springs Park and Preserve
Berry Springs RV Park
New Life RV Park

Gallery

Protected areas of Williamson County, Texas
Parks in Texas